The 1919 Nebraska Cornhuskers football team represented the University of Nebraska in the 1919 college football season. The team was coached by first-year head coach Henry Schulte and played its home games at Nebraska Field in Lincoln, Nebraska. The team competed as an independent, departing the Missouri Valley Conference after thirteen seasons. Schulte became the twelfth official head coach in the program's twenty-nine years of competition; his first team faced a daunting schedule consisting of Iowa, Notre Dame, Minnesota, and Syracuse as Nebraska's athletic department sought to schedule high-profile matchups.

Schedule

Coaching staff

Roster

Game summaries

at Iowa

Sources:

at Minnesota

Sources:

Two goal-line stands and a nine-yard touchdown rush gave Minnesota a 6–0 halftime lead. A long touchdown by backup Elmer Schellenberg tied the game at six at the end of the third quarter; NU missed the point after and the game ended in a tie.

Notre Dame

Sources:

A reverse pass on the first drive of the game gave Notre Dame an early lead. NU scored before halftime, but Notre Dame star George Gipp dominated in the second half and the Irish won 14–9. Nebraska lost three consecutive games for the first time since 1899.

Oklahoma

Sources:

Iowa State

Sources:

Nebraska failed to win for the fifth consecutive game, tying the program's longest such stretch.

at Missouri

Sources:

Despite missing five starters, Nebraska won its first game of the season in Columbia.

Kansas

Sources:

Syracuse

Sources:

On a snowy Thanksgiving day, Nebraska defeated Syracuse 3–0 to close the season with its third straight win.

References

Nebraska
Nebraska Cornhuskers football seasons
Nebraska Cornhuskers football